Thomas Allwright Dibbs (1 November 1833 – 18 March 1923) was an Australian banker.

Dibbs was born in George Street, Sydney, the second son of Captain John Dibbs of St Andrews, Scotland, and brother of New South Wales Premier Sir George Dibbs. His father was institutionalized in the Royal India Asylum when he was a boy, and at the age of 14 Dibbs entered the service of the Commercial Banking Company of Sydney as a junior clerk. In 1857 he became accountant, and 10 years later was appointed general manager, a position he held for 48 years. In 1877 Dibbs published a booklet Interest Tables and established some important banking practices in Sydney. In 1915 Dibbs retired at the age of 82, when he was made an honorary director of the bank and given a pension of £2000 a year. In 1916 he presented his house, Graythwaite, North Sydney, to the Commonwealth for a home for sick and wounded soldiers. Dibbs died at Sydney on 18 March 1923. He married in 1857 Tryphena Gaden who survived him with six daughters. He was knighted in 1917. He was much interested in the Church of England, and was treasurer of the church buildings loan and other funds. He was also a trustee of various public funds. He was well known as a yachtsman and for some years was commodore of the Royal Sydney Yacht Squadron.

Dibbs was regarded as an ideal banker. He built up a fine staff from which he had complete loyalty, and he guided the affairs of his bank with ability for a period which was probably record-breaking. He discouraged the land-booming of the 1880s, and when the crash came in 1893 met the situation with wisdom. For many years Dibbs was the trusted confidential adviser in financial matters of the various New South Wales governments, and when he retired in 1915 the government of the state presented an address to him expressing "profound recognition of the invaluable services rendered by him to vital public interests . . . a testimony without parallel in the history of Australian business life".

References

1832 births
1923 deaths
Australian bankers